Rogers Glacier is a broad glacier entering the eastern side of Amery Ice Shelf close northward of McKaskle Hills. Delineated in 1952 by John H. Roscoe from air photos taken by U.S. Navy Operation Highjump (1946–47), and named by him for Lieutenant Commander William J. Rogers, Jr., U.S. Navy, plane commander of one of the three air crews during Operation Highjump which took air photos of the coastal areas between 14 and 164 East longitude.

See also
 List of glaciers in the Antarctic
 Glaciology

References
 

Glaciers of Ingrid Christensen Coast